Shilovskaya is a rural locality (a village) in Ust-Velskoye Rural Settlement of Velsky District, Arkhangelsk Oblast, Russia. The population was 405 as of 2014. There is 1 street.

Geography 
Shilovskaya is located on the Pezhma River, 7 km southwest of Velsk (the district's administrative centre) by road. Pogorelovskaya is the nearest rural locality.

References 

Rural localities in Velsky District